This is a list of works by Jason Zhang.

Studio albums

Soundtracks

Films

Microfilms

TV dramas

Singles

TV shows

Online games

Activities

Others

Music videos

References

Discographies of Chinese artists